"How Deep Is the Ocean?" is a popular song written by Irving Berlin in 1932. The song was developed from an earlier Berlin song "To My Mammy" which was sung by Al Jolson in his film Mammy (1930). In the earlier song, the lyrics include the questions "How deep is the ocean? / How high is the sky?" and this was the genesis of "How Deep Is the Ocean?".

Background
The song was written at a low point in Berlin's professional and personal life, and is among the select few of his numbers that were introduced on the radio rather than on stage or film. The song is a series of questions posed one after another, the only exception being the second line, "I'll tell you no lie." This song, together with "Say It Isn't So", were huge hits in 1932 and brought Berlin back to the top again.

Early recordings
Popular versions of "How Deep Is the Ocean?" in 1932 were by Guy Lombardo (vocal by Carmen Lombardo), Paul Whiteman and His Orchestra (with vocals by Jack Fulton), Rudy Vallée and Ethel Merman. Bing Crosby was another who recorded the song for Brunswick on October 14, 1932. In the 1940s Alfredo Antonini and his orchestra collaborated with Victoria Cordova and John Serry Sr. to record the song for Muzak.<ref>[https://catalog.loc.gov/vwebv/holdingsInfo?searchId=10072&recCount=25&recPointer=7&bibId=12506525 Victoria Cordova & The Alfredo Antonini Orchestra performing "How Deep Is the Ocean for Muzak (circa 1949)] as archived at the Library of Congress Online Catalog at catalog.loc.gov]</ref>

Dutch composer Pierre Courbois wrote a song based on the chords of "How Deep Is The Ocean" called "OPAQUE" and recorded it on CD.

Other recordings
 Paul Whiteman – 1932
 Benny Goodman with Peggy Lee – 1941
 Coleman Hawkins – 1943
 Nat King Cole – 1946
 Artie Shaw with Hal Stevens – 1946
 Charlie Parker – 1947
 Billie Holiday – Recital by Billie Holiday (1954)
 John Coltrane, Al Cohn, Zoot Sims, Hank Mobley – Tenor Conclave (1956)
 Kay Starr - Rockin' with Kay (1958)
 Frank Sinatra - Nice 'n' Easy (1960)
 Bill Evans Trio - Explorations (1961)
 Brenda Lee - Sincerely, Brenda Lee (1962)
 Al Hirt –  Trumpet and Strings (1962),  with arrangements by Marty Paich. The album peaked at No. 96 on the Billboard 200 chart.
 Miles Davis
 Stan Getz
 Oscar Peterson - A Portrait Of Frank Sinatra (1973)
 Tom Jones - Do You Take This Man (1979)
 Art Blakey with Wynton Marsalis – Straight Ahead (1981)
 Chet Baker and Paul Bley – Diane (1985)
 Liza Minnelli - Liza Minnelli At Carnegie Hall (1987)
 Allan Holdsworth - None Too Soon (1996)
 Diana Krall - Love Scenes (1997), This Dream of You (2020)
 Roy Haynes with Kenny Barron – Love Letters (2002)
 Fred Hersch – Night and the Music (2006)
 Annette Sanders (with Bob Florence) – You Will Be My Music (2007) 
 Eric Clapton - Clapton (2010)
 Barbra Streisand (with Jason Gould) - Partners (2014)
 Bob Dylan - Triplicate (2017)
 Rufus Wainwright - Rufus Wainwright and Amsterdam Sinfonietta Live (2021)
 Boogie Belgique - Machine (2022)

See also
List of 1930s jazz standards

References

Songs about oceans and seas
1932 songs
1932 singles
1930s jazz standards
Songs written by Irving Berlin
Ethel Merman songs
Al Hirt songs
Guy Lombardo songs